Tetraclita stalactifera, the ribbed barnacle, is a species of symmetrical sessile barnacle in the family Tetraclitidae. It is found in the western Atlantic Ocean.

Subspecies
These subspecies belong to the species Tetraclita stalactifera:
 Tetraclita stalactifera confinis Pilsbry, 1916
 Tetraclita stalactifera stalactifera (Lamarck, 1818)

References

stalactifera
Crustaceans described in 1818